Republican marriage was a method of execution that allegedly occurred in Nantes during the Reign of Terror in Revolutionary France and "involved tying a naked man and woman together and drowning them". This was reported to have been practised during the drownings at Nantes (noyades) that were ordered by local Jacobin representative-on-mission Jean-Baptiste Carrier between November 1793 and January 1794 in the city of Nantes. Most accounts indicate that the victims were drowned in the river Loire, although a few sources describe an alternative means of execution in which the bound couple is run through with a sword, either before, or instead of drowning.

The earliest reports of such "marriages" date from 1794, when Carrier was tried for his crimes, and they were soon cited by contemporary counter-revolutionary authors such as Louis-Marie Prudhomme and Louis Gabriel Ambroise de Bonald.

Description 

This form of execution is attributed to French Revolutionary Jean-Baptiste Carrier, who was sent to Nantes to suppress the counterrevolutionary forces and to appoint a Revolutionary Committee. One historian described the use of the practice as follows:

Details of the practice vary slightly, but are generally consistent with the description offered above. One author described how "marriages Républicains... consisted in binding together a man and woman, back to back, stripped naked, keeping them exposed for an hour, and then hurling them into the current of "la Baignoire Nationale", as the bloodhounds termed the Loire". British radical and Girondist sympathizer Helen Maria Williams, in her Sketch of the Politics of France, 1793–94, wrote that "innocent young women were unclothed in the presence of the monsters; and, to add a deeper horror to this infernal act of cruelty, were tied to young men, and both were cut down with sabers, or thrown into the river; and this kind of murder was called a republican marriage".

According to literary scholar Steven Blakemore, Williams seems to have regarded this as a form of "terrorist misogynism". Williams' description of the women as "innocent", in his view, "not only suggests that they were not guilty of aiding the rebels, but that they were young 'virgins'". He argues that in Williams' text, the male Jacobin executioners are portrayed as "sadistic, public voyeurs who delight in tying 'counter-revolutionary' men and women into forced positions of sterile intercourse, in a grotesque 'marriage' of the soon-to-be dead". Thus, "if the Old Regime, for Williams, represents the forced confinement of female beauty, the Terror represents beauty's degrading death".

Skepticism 
While the executions of men, women and children by drowning in Nantes is not generally disputed, the factual nature of the "republican marriages," in particular, has been doubted by several historians who alleged it to be a legend. The claim that such a manner of execution has been practised and ordered by Carrier appears for the first time in the trial of the members of the Revolutionary Committee of Nantes by the Revolutionary Tribunal in 1794. It was present in the report of Charles-Gilbert Romme and in several letters and witness testimonies. However, while a few witnesses asserted that they had heard about "republican marriages", none had actually seen one; one cited a drunken boatman who had used the term "civic marriage" but hadn't suggested that the executed were paired according to sex. As both the assistant-prosecutor and the defence mentioned, there was not enough evidence for that particular accusation, and it was crossed out from the indictment by the president of the jury. The remaining facts were entirely sufficient for Carrier and several of his closest accomplices to be sentenced to death. The reports of "republican marriages" nevertheless became well-known and were later cited by many authors writing about the Terror, who would elaborate on them, for example by adding the claim that the two victims were a priest and a nun.

Etymology 
The use of the term appears to be a mockery of the concept of "republican marriage" as an actual "secular" marriage. Books describe parents horrified to learn that their children planned a "republican marriage" instead of being married in a church. As one source describes the institution:

See also
Dechristianization of France during the French Revolution

References

External links

 Reference in Thomas Carlyle's The French Revolution: A History

1793 events of the French Revolution
1794 events of the French Revolution
Execution methods
Capital punishment in France
Violence in France
Women and death
Urban legends